Dodonaea aptera, commonly known as coast hop-bush, is a species of coastal shrub endemic to Western Australia.

Description
It grows as an erect or spreading shrub from a half to 3½ metres high.

Taxonomy
The species was published by Friedrich Anton Wilhelm Miquel in 1845, based on specimens collected in 1839 at Garden Island, Rottnest Island, and Arthurs Head, Fremantle.

Distribution and habitat
It is endemic to Western Australia, growing in limestone areas along the coast from Cape Leeuwin north to Shark Bay.

References

External links

aptera
Endemic flora of Australia
Rosids of Western Australia
Sapindales of Australia
Taxa named by Friedrich Anton Wilhelm Miquel